Brayton is a village and civil parish in the Selby District of North Yorkshire, England. The parish includes some of south-western Selby, as well as the village of Brayton.

The United Kingdom Census 2001 states the population of the parish of Brayton to be 5,514, reducing to 5,299 at the 2011 Census. 

The village was historically part of West Riding of Yorkshire until 1974.

Overview

Brayton is almost entirely residential with the exception of a few local shops, including a butchers and a post office.

Village schools are Brayton Academy, Brayton Juniors, and Brayton C of E Infants. The Infant School is one of the oldest buildings in the village. The school house was once home to the headmistress of Brayton school, and lessons were taken in a smaller building. The house is now a private residence, and the old school room is now a small part of the extended building.

Brayton Methodist Church and St Wilfrid's church are the two religious buildings. The Methodist chapel was built in 1844, extended in 1961 and the 1961 extension re-developed in 1994. It is reputed that John Wesley, the founder of Methodism who travel widely throughout the country, preached on the original Village Green (the triangle adjacent to the chapel) but there is no documentary evidence to prove this. Being a small person, it is also reputed that he stood on a chair in order to be seen. That chair (?) with an appropriate plaque has been the pulpit chair in the chapel since the chapel was built.

The Grade I listed Church of England parish church, dedicated to  St Wilfrid, dates from the 12th to the 15th centuries with 19th-century alterations and stained glass. Within the church is a tomb to Lord D'Arcy (died 1558), and his wife, its effigies damaged during the 17th-century Interregnum.

Governance
An electoral ward in the same name exists. This ward stretches to Barlow with a total population of 6,052.

References

External links

 Brayton Academy
 Brayton Community Centre
 St Wilfrid's Parish, Brayton

Civil parishes in North Yorkshire
Selby District
Villages in North Yorkshire